The Fourth Hughes ministry (Nationalist) was the 14th ministry of the Government of Australia. It was led by the country's 7th Prime Minister, Billy Hughes. The Fourth Hughes ministry succeeded the Third Hughes ministry, which dissolved on 8 January 1918 following the resignation of Hughes as Prime Minister after a vote of no-confidence within the Nationalist Party in the wake of a failed second referendum on conscription. However, due to a lack of alternative leaders, Hughes was immediately re-commissioned as Prime Minister by Governor-General Sir Ronald Munro Ferguson. The ministry was replaced by the Fifth Hughes ministry on 3 February 1920 following the 1919 federal election. 

Walter Massy-Greene, who died in 1952, was the last surviving member of the Fourth Hughes ministry.

Ministry

References

Ministries of George V
Hughes, 4
1918 establishments in Australia
1920 disestablishments in Australia
Cabinets established in 1918
Cabinets disestablished in 1920